Camunare Rojo TV is a Venezuelan community television channel.  In December 2003, CONATEL, together with the community of Urachiche, created Camunare Rojo TV. Camunare Rojo TV is currently on the air for about three hours a day and all of their programs are related to politics, the economy, and the social situation in the community during the "Bolivarian Revolution". Camunare Rojo TV signed an agreement with TeleSUR in March 2006, so that they could broadcast TeleSUR's newscast. Camunare Rojo TV serves a population of about three thousand.

See also
List of Venezuelan television channels

Television networks in Venezuela
Television stations in Venezuela
Television channels and stations established in 2003
2003 establishments in Venezuela
Television in Venezuela
Spanish-language television stations